We Thieves Are Honourable (Spanish:Los ladrones somos gente honrada is a 1942 Spanish comedy film directed by Ignacio F. Iquino and starring Amparo Rivelles, Matilde Artero and José Jaspe. The film was based on the 1941 play of the same title by Enrique Jardiel Poncela. In 1956 the film was remade.

Cast
In alphabetical order
 Matilde Artero 
 Amparo Cervera
 Fernando Freire 
 José Jaspe 
 Manuel Luna as El Melancólico  
 Ramón Martori 
 Arturo Morillo 
 Angelita Navalón 
 Mercè Nicolau 
 Antonio Riquelme as El Castelar  
 Amparo Rivelles 
 José Sanchíz 
 Joaquín Torréns    
 Mercedes Vecino 
 Luis Villasiul

References

Bibliography 
 Bentley, Bernard. A Companion to Spanish Cinema. Boydell & Brewer, 2008.

External links
 

1941 films
1941 comedy films
Spanish comedy films
1940s Spanish-language films
Spanish films based on plays
Films directed by Ignacio F. Iquino
Films with screenplays by Ignacio F. Iquino
Spanish black-and-white films
1942 comedy films
1942 films
1940s Spanish films